Urraca of Portugal (1148 – 1211) was the queen of León from 1165 until 1171 or 1172 as the wife of King Ferdinand II. She was the daughter of the first Portuguese king, Afonso I, and the mother of Alfonso IX. After her marriage to Ferdinand was annulled, the former queen became a nun.

Family 
Urraca was born in Coimbra in 1148. She was the daughter of Afonso I, the first king of Portugal, and Maud of Savoy. She had several siblings, including Sancho I. In May or June 1165, Urraca married Ferdinand II of León. The only son of this marriage, Alfonso IX, was born in Zamora on 15 August 1171. The marriage of Ferdinand II and Urraca was annulled in 1171 or 1172 by Pope Alexander III because the two were second cousins, great-grandchildren of Alfonso VI of León and Castile.

Monasticism
After the annulment of her marriage, Urraca became a nun, joining the Order of Saint John of Jerusalem. She retired to live in the estates that her former husband had given her in the Carta de Arras (wedding tokens) in Zamora. Later, she resided in the Monastery of Santa María de Wamba, which belonged to the aforementioned order.

On 25 May 1176, Queen Urraca donated land and villas to the Order of Saint John, probably coinciding with her joining the order. These properties included Castroverde de Campos and Mansilla in León, and Salas and San Andrés in Asturias. She was present in 1188 at the coronation of her son Alfonso IX, who succeeded his father Ferdinand II on 22 January 1188. On 4 May in that same year, she and her son confirmed the privileges granted by Ferdinand II to the Order of Santiago. Her presence is registered for the last time in medieval charters in 1211, when she donated the village of Castrotoraf, which she had received from Ferdinand in 1165 as a wedding gift, to the Cathedral of Zamora.

Death 
Queen Urraca died in Wamba, Valladolid, in 1211. She was buried at the Monastery of Santa María de Wamba in what is now the province of Valladolid. St Mary's, the former monastic church and the only part remaining of the ancient monastery, contains the Chapel of the Queen: a plaque that was placed there subsequently mentions that Queen Urraca had been interred in this church.

Citations

Bibliography 

1148 births
1211 deaths
12th-century nobility from León and Castile
12th-century Portuguese people
12th-century Portuguese women
Burials in the Community of Castile and León
Galician queens consort
House of Burgundy-Portugal
Daughters of kings
Leonese queen consorts
People from Coimbra
Portuguese infantas
Portuguese people of Spanish descent
Portuguese people of French descent
Portuguese people of Italian descent